The M49 is a short metropolitan route in Greater Johannesburg, South Africa.

Route 
The M49 begins at the M53 and ends at the M37.

References 

Streets and roads of Johannesburg
Metropolitan routes in Johannesburg